Ivan Marchenko is the apparent identity of Ivan the Terrible (Treblinka guard), a guard at Nazi camp. Ivan the Terrible was previously alleged to be Ukrainian camp guard John Demjanjuk.

Ivan Marchenko may also refer to:

 Ivan Marchenko (politician), a Ukrainian parliamentary